Scythris capitalis is a moth of the family Scythrididae. It was described by Nikolay Grigoryevich Erschoff in 1874. It is found in Afghanistan, Kazakhstan, Kyrgyzstan, Turkey, Turkmenistan, Tajikistan and Uzbekistan.

References

capitalis
Moths described in 1874
Moths of Asia